Metallic hydrogen is a phase of hydrogen in which it behaves like an electrical conductor. This phase was predicted in 1935 on theoretical grounds by Eugene Wigner and Hillard Bell Huntington.

At high pressure and temperatures, metallic hydrogen can exist as a partial liquid rather than a solid, and researchers think it might be present in large quantities in the hot and gravitationally compressed interiors of Jupiter and Saturn, as well as in some exoplanets.

Theoretical predictions

Hydrogen under pressure
Though often placed at the top of the alkali metal column in the periodic table, hydrogen does not, under ordinary conditions, exhibit the properties of an alkali metal. Instead, it forms diatomic  molecules, similar to halogens and some nonmetals in the second period of the periodic table, such as nitrogen and oxygen. Diatomic hydrogen is a gas that, at atmospheric pressure, liquefies and solidifies only at very low temperature (20 degrees and 14 degrees above absolute zero, respectively). 

Since then, producing metallic hydrogen in the laboratory has been described as "...the holy grail of high-pressure physics."

The initial prediction about the amount of pressure needed was eventually shown to be too low.

Liquid metallic hydrogen
Helium-4 is a liquid at normal pressure near absolute zero, a consequence of its high zero-point energy (ZPE). The ZPE of protons in a dense state is also high, and a decline in the ordering energy (relative to the ZPE) is expected at high pressures. Arguments have been advanced by Neil Ashcroft and others that there is a melting point maximum in compressed hydrogen, but also that there might be a range of densities, at pressures around 400 GPa, where hydrogen would be a liquid metal, even at low temperatures.

Within this flat region there might be an elemental mesophase intermediate between the liquid and solid state, which could be metastably stabilized down to low temperature and enter a supersolid state.

Superconductivity

In 1968, Neil Ashcroft suggested that metallic hydrogen might be a superconductor, up to room temperature. This hypothesis is based on an expected strong coupling between conduction electrons and lattice vibrations.
This may have actually been confirmed as of early 2019; metallic hydrogen has been made at least twice in the laboratory, and a 250K Meissner effect has been tentatively observed but not independently verified by Silvera et al. and a team in France.

As a rocket propellant
Metastable metallic hydrogen may have potential as a highly efficient rocket propellant, with a theoretical specific impulse of up to 1700 seconds (for reference, the current most powerful chemical rocket propellants have an  less than 500), although a metastable form suitable for mass-production and conventional high-volume storage may not exist. Another significant issue is the heat of the reaction, which at over 6000 K is too high for any known engine materials to be used. This would necessitate diluting the metallic hydrogen with water or liquid hydrogen, a mixture that would still provide a significant performance boost from current propellants.

Possibility of novel types of quantum fluid
Presently known "super" states of matter are superconductors, superfluid liquids and gases, and supersolids. Egor Babaev predicted that if hydrogen and deuterium have liquid metallic states, they might have quantum ordered states that cannot be classified as superconducting or superfluid in the usual sense. Instead, they might represent two possible novel types of quantum fluids: superconducting superfluids and metallic superfluids. Such fluids were predicted to have highly unusual reactions to external magnetic fields and rotations, which might provide a means for experimental verification of Babaev's predictions. It has also been suggested that, under the influence of a magnetic field, hydrogen might exhibit phase transitions from superconductivity to superfluidity and vice versa.

Lithium alloying reduces requisite pressure
In 2009, Zurek et al. predicted that the alloy  would be a stable metal at only one quarter of the pressure required to metallize hydrogen, and that similar effects should hold for alloys of type LiHn and possibly "other alkali high-hydride systems", i.e. alloys of type XHn where X is an alkali metal.
This was later verified in AcH8 and LaH10 with Tc approaching 270K leading to speculation that other compounds may even be stable at mere MPa pressures with room temperature superconductivity.

Experimental pursuit

Shock-wave compression, 1996
The team did not expect to produce metallic hydrogen, as it was not using solid hydrogen, thought to be necessary, and was working at temperatures above those specified by metallization theory. The team had sought simply to measure the less extreme electrical conductivity changes they expected. The researchers used a 1960s-era light-gas gun, originally employed in guided missile studies, to shoot an impactor plate into a sealed container containing a half-millimeter thick sample of liquid hydrogen. The liquid hydrogen was in contact with wires leading to a device measuring electrical resistance. Because the thermal energy of the fluid (the temperature became about  due to compression of the sample) was above , the hydrogen might be considered metallic.

Other experimental research, 1996–2004
Many experiments are continuing in the production of metallic hydrogen in laboratory conditions at static compression and low temperature. The quest to see metallic hydrogen in laboratory at low temperature and static compression continues. Studies are also ongoing on deuterium. Shahriar Badiei and Leif Holmlid from the University of Gothenburg have shown in 2004 that condensed metallic states made of excited hydrogen atoms (Rydberg matter) are effective promoters to metallic hydrogen, however these results are disputed.

Pulsed laser heating experiment, 2008
The theoretically predicted maximum of the melting curve (the prerequisite for the liquid metallic hydrogen) was discovered by Shanti Deemyad and Isaac F. Silvera by using pulsed laser heating. Hydrogen-rich molecular silane was claimed to be metallized and become superconducting by M.I. Eremets et al.. This claim is disputed, and their results have not been repeated.

Observation of liquid metallic hydrogen, 2011
This claim was questioned by other researchers in 2012.

Z machine, 2015
In 2015, scientists at the Z Pulsed Power Facility announced the creation of metallic deuterium using dense liquid deuterium, an electrical insulator-to-conductor transition associated with an increase in optical reflectivity.

Claimed observation of solid metallic hydrogen, 2016
On 5 October 2016, Ranga Dias and Isaac F. Silvera of Harvard University released claims of experimental evidence that solid metallic hydrogen had been synthesized in the laboratory at a pressure of around  using a diamond anvil cell. This manuscript was available in October 2016, and a revised version was subsequently published in the journal Science in January 2017.

In the preprint version of the paper, Dias and Silvera write:

Silvera stated that they did not repeat their experiment, since more tests could damage or destroy their existing sample, but assured the scientific community that more tests are coming.  He also stated that the pressure would eventually be released, in order to find out whether the sample was metastable (i.e., whether it would persist in its metallic state even after the pressure was released).

Shortly after the claim was published in Science, Nature news division published an article stating that some other physicists regarded the result with skepticism. Prominent members of the high pressure research community criticized the claimed results, questioning the claimed pressures or the presence of metallic hydrogen at the pressures claimed.

In February 2017, it was reported that the sample of claimed metallic hydrogen was lost, after the diamond anvils it was contained between broke.

In August 2017, Silvera and Dias issued an erratum to the Science article, regarding corrected reflectance values due to variations between the optical density of stressed natural diamonds and the synthetic diamonds used in their pre-compression diamond anvil cell.

In June 2019 a team at the Commissariat à l'énergie atomique et aux énergies alternatives (French Alternative Energies & Atomic Energy Commission) claimed to have created metallic hydrogen at around 425GPa using a toroidal profile diamond anvil cell produced using electron beam machining.

W. Ferreira et al. (including Dias and Silvera) released a preprint in September 2022 claiming to have repeated the experiment, finding metallisation of hydrogen between 477–491 GPa. This time, the pressure was released to assess the question of metastability. They reported that metallic hydrogen was not found to be metastable to zero pressure, and that transformation to the molecular phase likely occurred between 113 and 84 GPa. The authors plan to study the metallisation and metastability of deuterium in the future.

Experiments on fluid deuterium at the National Ignition Facility, 2018
In August 2018, scientists announced new observations  regarding the rapid transformation of fluid deuterium from an insulating to a metallic form below 2000 K. Remarkable agreement is found between the experimental data and the predictions based on Quantum Monte Carlo simulations, which is expected to be the most accurate method to date. This may help researchers better understand giant gas planets, such as Jupiter, Saturn and related exoplanets, since such planets are thought to contain a lot of liquid metallic hydrogen, which may be responsible for their observed powerful magnetic fields.

See also
Hydride#Interstitial hydrides or metallic hydrides
Hydrogen safety#Cryogenics
Juno (spacecraft)
Metallization pressure
Slush hydrogen
Timeline of hydrogen technologies

References

Hydrogen
Phases of matter
Physical chemistry
Hydrogen physics
Hydrogen
2016 in science
October 2016 events
Superfluidity